The 1996 Skate Canada International was the second event of six in the 1996–97 ISU Champions Series, a senior-level international invitational competition series. It was held in Kitchener, Ontario on November 7–10. Medals were awarded in the disciplines of men's singles, ladies' singles, pair skating, and ice dancing. Skaters earned points toward qualifying for the 1996–97 Champions Series Final.

Results

Men

Ladies

Pairs

Ice dancing

References

Skate Canada International, 1996
Skate Canada International
1996 in Canadian sports 
1996 in Ontario